Elk Grove is a town in Lafayette County, Wisconsin, United States. The population was 551 at the 2010 census, up from  463 at the 2000 census. The unincorporated communities of Elk Grove, Ipswich, and Meekers Grove are located in the town.

Geography
Elk Grove is in western Lafayette County and is bordered to the west by Grant County. It is drained by the Galena River and its tributaries.

Demographics
As of the census of 2000, there were 463 people, 145 households, and 112 families residing in the town. The population density was 12.8 people per square mile (4.9/km2). There were 158 housing units at an average density of 4.4 per square mile (1.7/km2). The racial makeup of the town was 97.41% White, 0.22% Native American and 2.38% Asian. Hispanic or Latino of any race were 0.22% of the population.

There were 145 households, out of which 43.4% had children under the age of 18 living with them, 62.8% were married couples living together, 6.2% had a female householder with no husband present, and 22.1% were non-families. 19.3% of all households were made up of individuals, and 7.6% had someone living alone who was 65 years of age or older. The average household size was 3.19 and the average family size was 3.72.

In the town, the population was spread out, with 35.9% under the age of 18, 9.1% from 18 to 24, 27.9% from 25 to 44, 19.0% from 45 to 64, and 8.2% who were 65 years of age or older. The median age was 30 years. For every 100 females, there were 121.5 males. For every 100 females age 18 and over, there were 130.2 males.

The median income for a household in the town was $36,607, and the median income for a family was $43,750. Males had a median income of $21,477 versus $20,000 for females. The per capita income for the town was $13,519. About 12.1% of families and 19.8% of the population were below the poverty line, including 31.3% of those under age 18 and 9.1% of those age 65 or over.

References

Towns in Lafayette County, Wisconsin
Towns in Wisconsin